Volver a empezar may refer to:

Volver a Empezar (telenovela), a Mexican soap opera of the 1990s
Volver a empezar (film), a Spanish film of 1982
 "Volver a Empezar", Spanish cover of "Begin the Beguine" by Julio Iglesias